Achiemore is the name of several places in Sutherland in Scotland:
Achiemore, Durness, near Durness, on the road to Cape Wrath
Achiemore, Strath Halladale, in Strath Halladale, between Forsinard and Melvich